Evergestis fulgura is a species of moth in the family Crambidae. It is found in Morocco.

The wingspan is about 38 mm. In the Middle Atlas Mountains, adults are on wing in August. In Meknès, adults have been recorded in October.

References

Moths described in 1933
Evergestis
Moths of Africa